Tetín is a village and municipality in Jičín District in the Hradec Králové Region of the Czech Republic.

Administrative parts
The village of Vidoň is an administrative part of Tetín.

References

Villages in Jičín District